The mottled mojarra (Ulaema lefroyi) is a species of mojarra native to the Atlantic and Gulf of Mexico coasts of the Americas from North Carolina to Brazil, where adults can be found off sandy shorelines.  This species grows to  total length, and is the only known member of its genus.

References

External links
 Photograph

Gerreidae
Monotypic fish genera
Fish described in 1874
Taxobox binomials not recognized by IUCN